CentralMarina, formerly known as Central Center Pattaya, is a shopping mall on Pattaya Sai 2 Road in Bang Lamung, Chonburi, Thailand. It is the first CPN's shopping center that located in Pattaya Beach, another is CentralFestival Pattaya Beach.

Overview
Central Marina is the first CPN's shopping center outside of Bangkok. The shopping mall has a total of 3 floors. With 2 anchor chain.

Anchor
 Big C
 Supersports (Old Fit by Supersports)
 Thai Flavorites by Tops Food Hall
 Food Park and Seafood Market
 Public House
 Marina Market
 SFC Cinema 6 movie screens

See also
 List of shopping malls in Thailand

Notes

References 
 
 

Shopping malls in Thailand
Central Pattana
Shopping malls established in 1995
Buildings and structures in Pattaya
Tourist attractions in Chonburi province
1995 establishments in Thailand